Miniature cattle are found in various parts of the world. Some, such as the Dexter of Ireland and the Vechur of Kerala, India, are traditional breeds; others have been created by selective breeding. The Australian Lowline was the unexpected result of a scientific experiment. Some, but not all, miniature breeds display achondroplasia, or dwarfism.

Compared to larger cattle, miniature cattle require less space and less feed, and may be easier to handle. They do less damage to pasture land, do not need such high or strong fencing, and do not produce as much methane.

Breeds 

An American breeder, Richard Gradwohl, has developed eighteen different strains of miniature cattle. Miniature Galloway, Hereford and Holstein have been bred. In the United States, small zebuine cattle deriving from stock imported from Brazil, the Dominican Republic and Sweden may be registered as "Miniature Zebu"; in Australia, similar cattle may be known as "Nadudana".

The Ethiopian Goffa and Guraghe breeds in the Abyssinian Shorthorned Zebu group are also small.

References

Cattle